"Light It Up" is a song co-written and recorded by American country music singer Luke Bryan. It was released in August 2017 as the first single from his 2017 album What Makes You Country. Bryan wrote this song with Brad Tursi of the band Old Dominion.

Content
Rolling Stone Country described the song as "a moody production, underpinned by a programmed beat and choppy piano chords, while icy synthesizer fills lifted from Eighties new wave ratchet up the tension." The song is an expression of unrequited love, with the narrator pleading for an unresponsive lover to "light it up", in reference to his cellular phone.

Bryan wrote the song with Brad Tursi of the band Old Dominion, while Jeff Stevens and his son Jody produced it.

Music video
A video directed by Michael Monaco was released on October 26, 2017. It features Jimmy Butler in the lead role, in anticipation of a text as described in the lyrics.

Chart performance
For the charts dated September 9, 2017, "Light It Up" debuted at No. 20 on Country Airplay and No. 21 on Hot Country Songs. It sold 18,000 downloads in under two days and debuted at No. 3 on the Country Digital Song Sales chart. The following week it rose to No. 2  on Country Digital Song Sales with 22,000 copies sold on a full week of sales. It also debuted at number 76 on the US Billboard Hot 100 chart for the week of September 16, 2017.  The song has sold 164,000 copies in the United States as of January 2018. On March 5, 2019, the single was certified platinum by the Recording Industry Association of America (RIAA) for sales of over a million digital copies in the United States.

Charts

Weekly charts

Year-end charts

Certifications

References

2017 singles
2017 songs
Luke Bryan songs
Capitol Records Nashville singles
Songs written by Luke Bryan
Songs written by Brad Tursi